St. Saviour's Anglican Church or variants thereof may refer to:

 St. Saviour's Anglican Church (Barkerville, British Columbia)
St. Saviour's Anglican Church (Orono, Ontario)